Daniele Gregori (born February 18, 1977 in Foligno) is an Italian professional football player currently playing for Foligno Calcio.

He played 14 games in the Serie A in the 2002/03 season for Calcio Como.

In July 2003, after Enrico Preziosi acquired Genoa, he was sold to the club for free but in January 2004 returned to Como for 750,000. In 2008 Preziosi was found guilty and his football ban was upheld.

References

External links
 

1977 births
Living people
Italian footballers
Serie A players
Serie B players
L'Aquila Calcio 1927 players
A.S. Sambenedettese players
Delfino Pescara 1936 players
Como 1907 players
Genoa C.F.C. players
U.S. Salernitana 1919 players
Venezia F.C. players
S.S.D. Pro Sesto players
Benevento Calcio players
Association football defenders